Lyle Smith (born 3 March 1958) is an Australian former swimmer. She competed in the women's 100 metre butterfly at the 1976 Summer Olympics.

References

External links
 

1958 births
Living people
Olympic swimmers of Australia
Swimmers at the 1976 Summer Olympics
Place of birth missing (living people)
Australian female butterfly swimmers